Linnaeus or Linne may  refer to:

7412 Linnaeus, an asteroid
Linné (crater), a crater on the moon's surface

Places
Linnaeus Terrace, Victoria Land, Antarctica
Linne, Limburg, the Netherlands
Linne, Greater Poland Voivodeship, a village in west-central Poland
Linne, Kuyavian-Pomeranian Voivodeship, a village in north-central Poland
Linneus, Maine, USA
Linneus, Missouri, USA

People
Carl Linnaeus (1707–1778), Swedish botanist
Carl Linnaeus the Younger (1741-1783) Carl's son who survived to adulthood
Larry Linne (born 1962), American football player and businessman 
Samuel Linnaeus (1718-1797), Carl's brother
William Linnæus Gardner (1770-1835), an officer in the Indian army

See also
Commemoration of Carl Linnaeus
"The Heir of Linne", a traditional folk song
Linnéa, a given name
Loch Linnhe (Linne in Gaelic), sea loch on the west coast of Scotland
Linnet, a small bird